and  are songs by the Japanese rock band Chatmonchy. Both songs were released as a double A-side single on 4 March 2015. It was only single that released Limited edition with DVD. Both song also appeared on their sixth studio album, Kyōmei.

Music video
The music video for "Tokimeki" was directed by Yasuhiko Shimizu, while "Tonari no Onna" was directed by NuQ. "Tokimeki" video features Chatmonchy eat strawberry and running toward heart shaped thing in red background. For "Tonari no Onna", music video features animated style with a nude woman who have a good career, then falling down.

Track listing

Personnel
Adapted from the single liner notes.

Chatmonchy
 Eriko Hashimoto – vocals, guitars,
 Akiko Fukuoka – bass guitar, vocals, chorus

Additional musicians
 Aiko Kitano – drums, chorus
 Hiroko Sebu – piano, synthesizer, chorus

Production
 Michifumi Onodera – recording, mixing
 Tsubasa Yamazaki – mastering
 Shojiro Watanabe – recording, mixing (track 3)

Artwork and design
 STOMACHACHE – illustration
 Takashi Takamori – design

Charts

Release history

References

Chatmonchy songs
2015 singles
2015 songs
Ki/oon Music singles